Arndell Neil Lewis (23 November 1897 – 27 December 1943) was an Australian politician.

He was born in Perth in Tasmania. In 1932 he was elected to the Tasmanian House of Assembly as a Nationalist member for Denison. Defeated in 1934, he returned to the House in 1937, remaining until his resignation in 1941. Lewis died in Hobart in 1943.

References

1897 births
1943 deaths
Nationalist Party of Australia members of the Parliament of Tasmania
Members of the Tasmanian House of Assembly
20th-century Australian politicians
Australian Army personnel of World War II
Australian colonels